Since 1996, the IFPI have awarded Platinum Europe Awards for albums that have sold at least one million copies in Europe. Only albums released on or after 1 January 1994 are eligible for the award. This is a list of the best-selling albums in Europe, having been certified Platinum five times or more.

List of best-selling albums in Europe of the IFPI Platinum Europe Awards

10× Platinum

9× Platinum

8× Platinum

7× Platinum

6× Platinum

5× Platinum

By claimed sales 
Previously, IFPI, Music & Media awarded album sales in the Pan-European sphera like The Bodyguard soundtrack which earned 7× platinum, equivalent to 7 million copies. They also reported sales amount in the case of several album's artists in their regular articles.

*Positions based on claimed sales and release year.

References 

Europe